The first Rutte cabinet, also called the Rutte–Verhagen cabinet was the executive branch of the Government of the Netherlands from 14 October 2010 until 5 November 2012. The cabinet was formed by the conservative-liberal People's Party for Freedom and Democracy (VVD) and the Christian-democratic Christian Democratic Appeal (CDA) after the election of 2010. The cabinet was a right-wing coalition and had a minority in the House of Representatives but had confidence and supply from the Party for Freedom (PVV) for a slim majority with Liberal Leader Mark Rutte serving as Prime Minister. Christian Democratic Leader Maxime Verhagen served as Deputy Prime Minister and Minister of Economic Affairs, Agriculture and Innovation.

The cabinet served in the early years of the 2010s. Domestically, it had to deal with the fallout of the financial crisis of 2008 but it was able to implement several major social reforms to law enforcement, victims' rights and immigration. Internationally, it had to deal with the European debt crisis, the war on terror and the government support for the Task Force Uruzgan. The cabinet suffered several major internal and external conflicts because of the confidence and supply construction from the Party for Freedom. The cabinet fell just 18 months into its term on 23 April 2012 after the Party for Freedom withdrew its support following a disagreeing with the coalition over stronger austerity measures to reduce the deficit following the financial crisis. The cabinet continued in a demissionary capacity until it was replaced by the second Rutte cabinet following the election of 2012.

Formation

Following the collapse of the fourth Balkenende cabinet on 20 February 2010, elections for the House of Representatives were held on 9 June 2010. As usual in Dutch politics, none of the parties had a majority and several informateurs were appointed to investigate the formation of a coalition cabinet. A broad coalition consisting of the People's Party for Freedom and Democracy (VVD), Christian Democratic Appeal (CDA) and the Labour Party (PvdA) was briefly looked at, but dismissed. Then negotiations for a "purple plus" coalition consisting of the People's Party for Freedom and Democracy (VVD), Labour Party (PvdA), Democrats 66 and GreenLeft lasted for about three weeks, but the parties could not reach agreement on the amount of budget cuts.

Finally, a construction which is rare for the Netherlands was investigated: a minority coalition consisting of the People's Party for Freedom and Democracy and Christian Democratic Appeal (together 52 out of 150 seats in the House of Representatives), supported in parliament by the Party for Freedom (PVV) (24 seats), to make the smallest possible majority of 76 seats. The right wing PVV had the largest gains in the recent elections.

The stated reason for this construction was that parties agreed that the largest party (the VVD) and the party with the largest gains (considered the 'winner' in Dutch politics) needed to be in power. Only the Christian Democratic Appeal could or wanted to help make a majority, but they were against forming a proper coalition with Party for Freedom (PVV) because of their different views on Islam and immigration. Therefore, negotiations were held to form a coalition agreement between the People's Party for Freedom and Democracy (VVD) and Christian Democratic Appeal (CDA), and to form a "parliamentary support agreement" between all three parties, which were successfully finished on 30 September 2010.

When Rutte took office on 14 October, it marked the first time that the VVD had led a government since its formation in 1946. It also marked the first liberal-led government since 1913.

Opposition parties and commentators expected that the coalition would prove to be unstable because at a special Christian Democratic Appeal conference, about a third of the party members voted against the formation of this cabinet. Also, at least three members of parliament in the CDA parliamentary fraction indicated to have difficulties with the cabinet. Eventually they left the parliament or supported the deal, pointing to the approval by the majority of the party conference.

When the cabinet took office, the three parties had a minority in the Senate of 35 out of 75 seats. The parties hoped this would change following the Dutch Senate election of 2011, but they obtained 37 seats, one short of a majority. A small protestant party, the Reformed Political Party, which obtained one seat, supported the cabinet in the Senate however.

The cabinet consisted of 12 Ministers and 8 State secretaries. The positions where divided equally among the coalition members, regardless of their respective size: People's Party for Freedom and Democracy (31 seats in parliament) supplied 6 Ministers and 4 State secretaries, and Christian Democratic Appeal (21 seats) also supplied 6 Ministers and 4 State secretaries.

Term

Policy
In accordance with the People's Party for Freedom and Democracy (VVD) approach to laissez-faire and a small government, the number of ministers and State Secretaries was reduced from the previous cabinet by merging several ministries. The Ministry of Agriculture, Nature and Food Quality was merged with the Ministry of Economic Affairs to form a combined Ministry Economic Affairs, Agriculture and Innovation. The Ministry of Housing, Spatial Planning and the Environment was merged with the Ministry of Transport and Water Management to form the new Ministry of Infrastructure and the Environment.

The portfolio of public security was transferred from the Ministry of the Interior and Kingdom Relations to the Ministry of Justice which was renamed as the Ministry of Security and Justice, in line with the tough security profile of the coalition parties, especially the VVD which delivered both the minister and state secretary for this department. Also the position of the Minister for Development Cooperation, a long serving Minister without portfolio title that had been used continuously since 1965 (except for a small break from 2002 to 2003), was scrapped and replaced by the return of a Minister without portfolio for Immigration and Asylum Affairs like in the previous Cabinets Balkenende I, II and III, but this time this post was placed at the department and budget of the Ministry of the Interior and Kingdom Relations instead of the Ministry of Security and Justice.

Withdrawal of support of the Party for Freedom
Because of the financial crisis in the Netherlands and because of the rules of the Euro convergence criteria that the deficit should be maximum 3%, the Leaders of the People's Party for Freedom and Democracy Mark Rutte, Christian Democratic Appeal Maxime Verhagen and the Party for Freedom Geert Wilders decided to talk with each other about new, severe austerity measures, worth about 14 billion Euro. The negotiations about the measures were held in the Catshuis and lasted 7 weeks and ended on 21 April when Geert Wilders walked out of the negotiations. The reason he gave was that the measure would negatively impact people who receive benefits from the pensions law. Both Mark Rutte and Maxime Verhagen blamed Wilders for the failure of the negotiations. As a result, the government resigned and a new election was called.

Composition changes
On 16 December 2011, Minister of the Interior and Kingdom Relations Piet Hein Donner (CDA) resigned after he was nominated as the new Vice-President of the Council of State succeeding Herman Tjeenk Willink. He was replaced as Minister of the Interior and Kingdom Relations by former Chairwoman of the Christian Democratic Appeal Liesbeth Spies. Piet Hein Donner as Minister of the Interior and Kingdom Relations was responsible for the portfolio of Integration. When he resigned the Integration portfolio was transferred to Minister without portfolio Gerd Leers.

Cabinet Members

Trivia

 Seven cabinet members would continued in the next cabinet: Mark Rutte (Prime Minister), Ivo Opstelten (Justice), Edith Schippers (Health), Henk Kamp (Economic Affairs), Melanie Schultz van Haegen (Infrastructure), Frans Weekers (Finance) and Fred Teeven (Justice).
 Seven cabinet members would later have high-profile work in public or private sector: Maxime Verhagen (trade association executive), Jan Kees de Jager (corporate director), Hans Hillen (trade association executive), Edith Schippers (corporate director), Henk Kamp (trade association executive), Melanie Schultz van Haegen (corporate director) and Halbe Zijlstra (corporate director).
 Five cabinet members (later) served as Mayors: Liesbeth Spies (Stichtse Vecht and Alphen aan den Rijn), Ivo Opstelten (Dalen, Doorn, Delfzijl, Beerta, Utrecht, Rotterdam and Tilburg), Marja van Bijsterveldt (Schipluiden and Delft), Gerd Leers (Maastricht and Brunssum) and Frans Weekers (Heerlen and Beek).
 Four cabinet members had previous experience as scholars or professors: Uri Rosenthal (Political Science and Public Administration), Piet Hein Donner (Jurisprudence), Ben Knapen (Media Studies) and Henk Bleker (Civil Law).
 Four cabinet continued from the previous cabinet: Maxime Verhagen (Foreign Affairs), Piet Hein Donner (Social Affairs), Jan Kees de Jager (Finance) and Marja van Bijsterveldt (Education).

References

External links
Official

  Kabinet-Rutte I Parlement & Politiek
  Kabinet-Rutte-Verhagen Rijksoverheid

Cabinets of the Netherlands
2010 establishments in the Netherlands
2012 disestablishments in the Netherlands
Cabinets established in 2010
Cabinets disestablished in 2012
Minority governments